Elson Aaron Kambalu is a Malawian artist based in Lilongwe, Malawi drawn to conceptual and participatory work. He is interested in sharing people's stories, and creating works that stimulate debate. He is also a curator and successful business person owning several art galleries in Malawi. He has been hailed as a champion of the artistic landscape in Malawi.

Early life 
Elson was born in December 1972, in Nsanje District, Malawi, to Aaron and Jane Kambalu, the fourth born child in a family of eight children. His father was a clinical officer working for Government hospital while his mother was a primary school teacher.

Education 
Elson studied for a Bachelor of Business Administration degree at University of Malawi (Polytechnic), graduating in 1997. He also holds a post graduate Diploma in Marketing with the Chartered Institute of Marketing, which he got in 2003.

Art career 
Elson is a self-taught artist, only realizing his career after graduating from the University of Malawi. He started painting in 1998, whilst employed by several organisations over a seven-year period. In 2005, at age of thirty-two, he quit his job to concentrate fully on his art. Also pursuing art and cultural entrepreneurship, he opened a company, Art-House Africa. 

His work has been exhibited in several countries across the world. He has been BBC’s Focus on Africa, CNN’s African Voices, and Mnet’s Studio 53.

Gallery owner 
After several exhibitions, he opened his first art gallery called Kamusu in 2008. In 2009, he started a publication called Sons and Daughters Magazine. In 2011, he acquired another gallery, La Galleria Africa. He also runs Savannah Duty Free Art Space at Kamuzu International Airport.

Style and technique 
Elson is a conceptual artist who mainly does Abstract expressionism and installations.

Exhibitions

Foreign Bodies, Common Ground 

In 2013, Elson was one of the international artists featured Foreign Bodies, Common Ground exhibition. The artists worked in research centers in Kenya, Malawi, South Africa, Thailand, Vietnam, and the UK, and were invited to spend at least six months exploring the activity of researchers and produce new work in response to their experiences. They recorded their experiences within the “complex realm that lies between scientific processes and local communities, often on the front lines of communicable diseases.”

While in residence, Elson explored both traditional and contemporary approaches to medicine and research. He interacted with a wide variety of people in urban and rural settings – from clinicians and traditional herbalists to study participants and tribal chiefs, from community workers and pharmacologists to health economists and musicians. Fascinated by the cultural complexities between research teams and the communities they serve, Elson invited people to create work inspired by their understandings and experiences of health studies.  Participants expressed and discussed their views regarding research.

See also 

 Kay Chiromo

References

External links 

 www.arthouseafrica.com
 www.elsonkambalu.com
 https://elsonkambalu.wordpress.com/tag/elson-kambalu/
 https://web.archive.org/web/20160304112403/http://www.artmajeur.com/en/artist/elsonart
 http://www.nyasatimes.com/tag/elson-kambalu/

Malawian artists
1972 births
Living people
People from the Southern Region, Malawi